Royce Lynn Money (born July 13, 1942) is an American academic administrator who served as president of Abilene Christian University from 1991 to 2010, whereupon he became Chancellor. He was succeeded as president by Phil Schubert.

Education
After attending Temple High School, Money graduated from Abilene Christian University, where he majored in Biblical Studies. He received a Bachelor of Sacred Theology from that college, a Master of Science in Human Development and the Family from the University of Nebraska at Lincoln, and a Ph.D. in Religion from Baylor University in Waco, Texas.

Career
Money has served continuously in the ministry even since 1981. His earlier ministerial roles having been in Silver Spring, Maryland; Montgomery, Alabama; Springfield, Missouri (where he was also an adjunct professor at Missouri State University); and Dallas, Texas. Money has held leadership positions in the Council for Christian Colleges and Universities, Abilene Chamber of Commerce, Independent Colleges and Universities of Texas, and United Way of Abilene. Money was Abilene's "Outstanding Citizen of the Year" for 2007.

Money has written two books on families.

Personal life
Since 1965, Money has been married to Pamela Joy Handy Money, whom he met when they were students at Abilene Christian University. The couple have two daughters.

References

1942 births
Living people
Abilene Christian University alumni
Abilene Christian University faculty
American members of the Churches of Christ
Baylor University alumni
Christian writers
Council for Christian Colleges and Universities
Ministers of the Churches of Christ
People from Abilene, Texas
People from Dallas
Writers from Montgomery, Alabama
People from Silver Spring, Maryland
Writers from Springfield, Missouri
People from Temple, Texas
Presidents of Abilene Christian University
University of Nebraska alumni